Anastasia was a Macedonian music group. The band was formed in 1987 as Apokrifna Realnost and changed their name to Anastasia in 1989. Their members are:

Goran Trajkoski (ex Afektiven Naboj, Saraceni, Padot na Vizantija, Mizar, Aporea)
Klime Kovaceski (ex Afektiven Naboj, Padot na Vizantija)
 Zlatko Origjanski (ex Lola V. Stain)
Zoran Spasovski (ex Mizar, Aporea)

Their music is a blend combining Byzantine past, through Eastern Orthodox Church music with a rich gamut of ethnic Macedonian music rhythms.

Anastasia have written several music scores for films, theater performances and TV programs. Their soundtrack for the Academy Award-nominated movie Before the Rain was released in 1994 by Polygram and sold thousands of copies worldwide. In the same year, the Thessaloniki-based label Poeta Negra released a 12" EP  containing the tracks "By the Rivers of Babylon" and "Pass Over." In 1997, they released "Melourgia" on the Greek label Libra (cat. no. L.M.007); the record included a reworked version of "By the Rivers of Babylon." This was followed by their last album to date, "Nocturnal," on the same label (cat.no. L.M.013); this record saw the band including electronic elements in their music as well.

Discography 
 Na rjekah vavilonskih (1988, self-released)
 Na rjekah vavilonskih (1990, DOM)
 Before the Rain (1994, PolyGram)
 Melourgia (1997, Libra Music)
 Nocturnal (1998, Third Ear Music)

See also
Goran Trajkovski
Padot na Vizantija
Mizar (band)
Arhangel
Music of North Macedonia

References

External links
Anastasia Website
Before the Rain soundtrack review

Macedonian musical groups
Musical groups established in 1987